Rhenen is a railway station located in Rhenen, Netherlands. The station was opened on 18 February 1886 and is located on the Kesteren–Amersfoort railway (Maarn - Rhenen). The services are currently operated by Nederlandse Spoorwegen. The station closed on 17 September 1944 and reopened on 31 May 1981. There is a single terminating platform.

Train services
The following services currently call at Rhenen:
2x per hour local service (sprinter) Breukelen - Utrecht - Rhenen

Bus services

 44
 45
 50
 80
 680
 683
 690

External links
NS website 
Dutch Public Transport journey planner 

Railway stations in Utrecht (province)
Railway stations opened in 1886
Rhenen